The sidecar is any cocktail traditionally made with cognac, orange liqueur (Cointreau, Grand Marnier, dry curaçao, or a triple sec), plus lemon juice. In its ingredients, the drink is perhaps most closely related to the older brandy crusta, which differs both in presentation and in proportions of its components.

Description

Like the daiquiri, the sidecar evolved from the original sour formula, but sidecars are often drier than sours, combining liqueurs like curaçao with citrus. Sidecars are considered more of a challenge for bartenders because the proportion of ingredients is more difficult to balance for liqueurs of variable sweetness.

Origin

The exact origin of the sidecar is unclear, but it is thought to have been invented around the end of World War I in either London or Paris. The drink was directly named for the motorcycle attachment, which was very commonly used back then.

The Ritz Hotel in Paris claims origin of the drink. The first recipes for the sidecar appear in 1922, in Harry MacElhone's Harry's ABC of Mixing Cocktails and Robert Vermeire's Cocktails and How to Mix Them.  It is one of six basic drinks listed in David A. Embury's The Fine Art of Mixing Drinks (1948).

In early editions of MacElhone's book, he cites the inventor as Pat MacGarry, "the popular bartender at Buck's Club, London", but in later editions he cites himself. While Vermiere states that the drink was "very popular in France. It was first introduced in London by MacGarry, the celebrated bartender of Buck's Club." Embury credits the invention of the drink to an American army captain in Paris during World War I and named after the motorcycle sidecar that the captain used.

Journalist O.O. McIntyre reports in his 1937 summary of a visit to New York City that bartenders there attributed the drink to American expatriates Erskine Gywnne and Basil Woon.

Both MacElhone and Vermiere state the recipe as equal parts cognac, Cointreau, and lemon juice, now known as "the French school". Later, an "English school" of sidecars emerged, as found in the Savoy Cocktail Book (1930), which call for two parts cognac and one part each of Cointreau and lemon juice.

According to Embury, the original sidecar had several ingredients, which were "refined away". Embury also states the drink is simply a daiquiri with brandy as its base rather than rum, and with Cointreau as the sweetening agent rather than sugar syrup. He recommends the same proportions (8:2:1) for both, making a much-less-sweet sidecar. However, Simon Difford, in his book Encyclopedia of Cocktails, notes Harry Craddock's ratio of 2:1:1 in The Savoy Cocktail Book, and then suggests a middle ground between Craddock's recipe and the "French school" equal parts recipe of 3:2:2, calling Embury's daiquiri formula "overly dry" for a sidecar.

The earliest mention of sugaring the rim on a sidecar glass is 1934, in three books: Burke's Complete Cocktail & Drinking Recipes, Gordon's Cocktail & Food Recipes, and Drinks As They Are Mixed (a revised reprint of Paul E. Lowe's 1904 book).

See also
 List of cocktails
 Margarita
 White lady

References

External links 

 December 2005 "Cocktail of the Month"  at Epicurious
 Drinkboy recipe

Cocktails with brandy
Cocktails with triple sec or curaçao
Sour cocktails